Daukantas is a Lithuanian surname. Notable people with the surname include:

 Simonas Daukantas (1793–1864), Lithuanian writer ethnographer and historian
 Feliksas Daukantas (1915–1995), Lithuanian painter
 Rytis Daukantas, Lithuanian architect and contemporary artist
 Teodoras Daukantas (1884–1960), Lithuanian Minister of Defense

See also
 Daukantas Square, Old Town, Vilnius

Lithuanian-language surnames